Big Lake State Park is a public recreation area located in northwest Missouri, United States. The  state park was established in 1932 at the northern end of the state's largest oxbow lake, Big Lake. Park activities include boating, camping, picnicking, fishing, and swimming. Because park accommodations have been repeatedly destroyed by Missouri River floods, the park began using wheeled rental cabins that can be moved in the event of flooding in 2016.

References

External links
 Big Lake State Park Missouri Department of Natural Resources
 Big Lake State Park Map Missouri Department of Natural Resources

Protected areas of Holt County, Missouri
State parks of Missouri
Protected areas established in 1932